The Birmingham Mail (branded the Black Country Mail in the Black Country) is a tabloid newspaper based in Birmingham, England but distributed around Birmingham, the Black Country, and Solihull and parts of Warwickshire, Worcestershire and Staffordshire.

Background 
The newspaper was founded as the Birmingham Daily Mail in 1870, in April 1963 it became known as the Birmingham Evening Mail and Despatch after merging with the Birmingham Evening Despatch and was titled the Birmingham Evening Mail from 1967 until October 2005. The Mail is published Monday to Saturday. The Sunday Mercury is a sister paper published on a Sunday.

The newspaper is owned by Reach plc, who also own the Daily Mirror and the Birmingham Post, the weekly business tabloid sold in the Birmingham area.

Editorial roles 
The current Birmingham Mail editor is Graeme Brown, who is also editor-in-chief of the Birmingham Post, the Sunday Mercury, and their sister website BirminghamLive. A former editor is Marc Reeves, and another previous editor of the newspaper was David Brookes, who held the role from 2009 until 2014.

Circulation 
The daily circulation of the paper is 8,628, as of December 2018..

References

External links
 Official website

Newspapers published in Birmingham, West Midlands
Publications established in 1870
Daily newspapers published in the United Kingdom
Newspapers published by Reach plc